Calvin Mbarga (born 26 June 1987) is a Cameroonian professional footballer who plays as a forward for Port Melbourne SC.

Career
Mbarga has spent the majority of his career playing in Cameroon, Canada, the United Arab Emirates, and Australia. While in Australia, Mbarga played for lower-division sides such as Western Strikers, Campbelltown City, Adelaide Blue Eagles, and Hume City. He joined Hume City in 2014.

Mbarga also works as a personal trainer in Southern Adelaide. He specialises in strength and conditioning training, weightloss, injury management, and sport specific training.

Salgaocar
In October 2015, Mbarga moved to India to sign with I-League side, Salgaocar, as their Asian quota player due to him having Australian citizenship.

References

1987 births
Living people
Cameroonian footballers
Salgaocar FC players
Association football forwards
I-League players
National Premier Leagues players
Expatriate footballers in India
Place of birth missing (living people)